Vaulx may refer to the following places:

France

Vaulx, Pas-de-Calais
Vaulx, Haute-Savoie
Vaulx-en-Velin, in the Rhône département
Vaulx-Milieu, in the Isère département 
Vaulx-Vraucourt, in the Pas-de-Calais département

Belgium

Vaulx, a district of the municipality of Chimay, Wallonia
Vaulx, a district of the municipality of Tournai, Wallonia

See also
Vaux (disambiguation)

oc:Vaulx